Tequila is an alcoholic drink made from agave juice.

Tequila may also refer to:

Places
Tequila, Jalisco, the town in Mexico where the drink was invented
Tequila, Veracruz, a municipality in Mexico

Music
Tequila (band), a Spanish rock group of the 1970s–1980s
TeQuila (born 1985), Namibian singer

Albums
Tequila (Brand New Sin album) (2006)
Tequila (Wes Montgomery album) (1966)

Songs
"Tequila" (Ally Brooke song), 2022
"Tequila" (The Champs song), 1958
"Tequila" (Dan + Shay song), 2018
"Tequila" (Jax Jones, Martin Solveig and Raye song), 2020
"Tequila" (Terrorvision song), 1999
"Tequila", a song by Kurupt from Tha Streetz Iz a Mutha, 1999

People with the name
TeQuila (born 1985), Namibian singer
Tila Tequila or Tila Nguyen (born 1981), Vietnamese-American model

Fictional characters
Tequila Marjoram, a character in the Galaxy Angel series
Tequila Yuen, a character in the movie Hard Boiled and the video game Stranglehold

See also
"Teqkilla", a song by M.I.A.
Tequila Sunrise (disambiguation)